is a Japanese voice actress from Fudai, Iwate. She is affiliated with Production Baobab.

Voice roles

Television animation
Ceres, The Celestial Legend (Shuro Tsukasa)
Detective School Q (Musashi Hachiya)
Idolmaster: Xenoglossia (Gojō)
Machine Robo Rescue (Makoto Aikawa, Kaizaki Kitazawa)
Mermaid Melody Pichi Pichi Pitch (Makoto)
Mermaid Melody Pichi Pichi Pitch Pure (Nagisa Shirai)
Princess Comet (Karon)

Video games
Crash Tag Team Racing (MotorWorld pedestrian) (Japanese dub)

Dubbing roles
The Glass House (TV edition) (Rhett Baker)
Power Rangers: Lightspeed Rescue (Kelsey Winslow (Sasha Williams))

Compact disc
Gangan Drama CD: Fullmetal Alchemist: The Land of Sand (Alphonse Elric)

External links
 
Production Baobab

1978 births
Japanese voice actresses
Living people
Voice actresses from Iwate Prefecture
21st-century Japanese actresses
Production Baobab voice actors